The Kentucky Derby is a 1922 American silent adventure film directed by King Baggot and starring Reginald Denny. It is based on a Broadway play The Suburban by Charles T. Dazey. It was produced and distributed by Universal Film Manufacturing Company. Denny's first starring feature-length movie.

The film survives today.

Cast
Reginald Denny as Donald Gordon
Lillian Rich as Alice Brown
Emmett King as Col. Moncrief Gordon
Walter McGrail as Ralph Gordon
Gertrude Astor as Helen Gordon
Lionel Belmore as Col. Rome Woolrich
Kingsley Benedict as Joe
Bert Woodruff as Rance Newcombe
Bert Tracy as Topper Tom
Harry Carter as Bob Thurston
Wilfred Lucas as Capt. Wolff
Pat Harmon as Jensen
Anna Dodge as Mrs. Clancy (* billed as Anna Hernandez)
Verne Winter as Timmy Clancy

See also
Gertrude Astor filmography

References

External links

Lobby poster

1922 films
1922 adventure films
American adventure films
American black-and-white films
American films based on plays
American horse racing films
American silent feature films
Films directed by King Baggot
Universal Pictures films
1920s American films
Silent adventure films
1920s English-language films